Eowudong or Uhwudong (어우동, 於宇同; 1440 - 18 October 1480), also known as Eoeuludong (어을우동, 於乙宇同), née Park (박, 朴), was a Korean dancer, writer, artist, and poet from a noble family in the Joseon Dynasty of the 15th century. Most of her work has not been preserved. She is described to be one of the evil women from the Joseon Dynasty along with Queen Munjeong, Jang Nok-su, and Royal Noble Consort Hui.

Life 
Born as Park Gu-ma (박구마, 朴丘麻), Uhwudong was from was a noble family, the Eumseong Park clan (음성 박씨, 陰城 朴氏), of the Joseon Dynasty. She married Yi Dong, Prince Taegang (태강수 이동, 泰江守 李仝), the great-grandson of Queen Wongyeong and King Taejong. She was forced to divorce him on account of adultery charges and subsequently she became an active poet, writer, artist, and dancer.

She was noted for her exceptional beauty, dancing, singing talent, poetry, quick wit and charm, and extraordinary intellect.

Sex scandal and execution
In 1480, she was put on trial for adultery.  She was charged with having committed adultery with multiple male partners, including royal relatives, court officials and slaves.    	 
	 
During this time period, the position of women deteriorated in Korea with the introduction of Confucian gender segregation, and there was an increasing severity in the persecution of women who committed adultery, and particularly noblewomen. Several such cases are known, such as those of Yu Gam-dong, who was sentenced to become a slave kisaeng, and Geumeumdong and Dongja, both noblewomen who were punished for having committed adultery with male relatives. Yi Gu-ji was also an example of committing adultery. The case of Uhwudong was however the perhaps most infamous of all, and became a famous scandal involving many men of high standing. The case ended with her conviction and execution. The death penalty for female adultery was formally introduced by king Jungjong of Joseon in 1513.

Family 
 Father
 Park Yun-chang (박윤창, 朴允昌)
 Mother
 Jeong Gwi-deok (정귀덕, 鄭貴德) (? - 20 June 1488)
 Sibling(s)
 Older brother - Park Seong-geun (박성근, 朴成根) (? - 22 August 1488)
 Husband
 Yi Dong (이동, 李仝)
 Father-in-law - Yi Jeong, Prince Yeongcheon (영천군 정) (1422 - ?)
 Mother-in-law - Princess Consort Kwon of the Yecheon Kwon clan (군부인 예천 권씨)
 Children
 Daughter - Yi Beon-jwa (이번좌)
 Unnamed son

Works 
Although only a handful of sijo (formatted verse used in Korea, as in English sonnet) and geomungo pieces exist today, they nonetheless show skilled craftsmanship of words and musical arrangement. These verses hint at the tragedy of her lost loves. Some are also responses to numerous famous classic Chinese poems and literature.

Poems 
[玉淚丁東夜氣淸 / The beads flow and illuminate the night]

玉淚丁東夜氣淸 / The beads flow like tears, illuminate the night

白雲高捲月分明 / The white clouds flow high, the moonlight is brighter.

間房叔謐餘香在 / Your scent remains in one small room.

可寫如今夢裏情 / I will be able to picture a dreamlike affection.

[白馬臺空經幾歲 / How long has the Baekma-dae been empty?]

白馬臺空經幾歲 / How many years passed the house been empty?

落花巖立過多時 / 'The stone with fluttering flowers(Nakwha-am)' spent many years standing.

靑山若不曾緘黙 / If the 'blue mountain(Cheong-san)' was not silent,

千古興亡問可知 / I would have been able to find out about the rising and falling of long time.

Legacy
Her personal life has become almost myth-like, having inspired novels, movies, TV series, operas, and numerous poets. After the destruction of the Joseon Dynasty in 1910, due to her renowned assertive and independent nature, she has become a modern popular cultural icon of Korea.

In popular culture
 Portrayed by Lee Bo-hee in the 1985 film Eoudong.
 Portrayed by Kim Muh-hee in the 1987 film Yohwa Eoeuludong.
 Portrayed by Kim Sa-rang in the 2007-2008 SBS TV series The King and I.
 Portrayed by Kang Eun-bi in the 2015 film Ownerless Flower Uhwudong.

See also 
 Hwang Jini
 Guji, Princess of Joseon
 Heo Nanseolheon
 Yu Gam-dong
 Shin Saimdang
 Lim Yunjidang
 Na Hye-sok

External links 
 어우동 
 어우동과 양반의 성문화 
 왕가의 며느리였던 '어우동'은 어떤 스캔들? - 오마이뉴스 2012.03.01 
 남성지배 사회에 맞선 어우동

References 

Year of birth unknown
1480 deaths
Korean writers
Korean female dancers
Korean artists
Kisaeng
15th-century Korean women writers
15th-century Korean writers
15th-century Korean painters
People from North Chungcheong Province
1440 births
Korean women poets
Korean women writers
15th-century Korean poets
15th-century dancers
15th-century women singers
Executed Korean women
15th-century executions
People executed for adultery